Tom Crosslin ( – September 3, 2001) was a marijuana rights activist who was shot and killed on his "Rainbow Farm" by an FBI agent.

Rainbow Farm 

Rainbow Farm was a campground run by Tom Crosslin and his life partner Rolland "Rollie" Rohm and home to two controversial festivals, HempAid on Memorial Day and Roach Roast on Labor Day. The owner of Rainbow Farm supported the "medical, spiritual, and responsible recreational uses of marijuana for a more sane and compassionate America". Rainbow Farm was the focus of an intensive investigation by Cass County prosecutor Scott Teter.  The investigation eventually came to a head in early September 2001 with the burning down of all the structures on the property and the shooting deaths of both Tom Crosslin and Rolland Rohm.

Timeline 
1993: Tom Crosslin buys the property for Rainbow Farm in Vandalia, Michigan. The farm begins holding annual "hemp festivals".
1996: Scott Teter is elected Cass County prosecutor.
1999–2000: Rainbow Farm campaigns for the Personal Responsibility Amendment, a failed measure that sought to legalize private use of marijuana.
May 2001: Crosslin and his lover, Rolland Rohm, are arrested for growing marijuana in their house. Rohm's son, Robert, is placed in foster care.
August 2001: Crosslin and Rohm skip their court date and begin systematically setting fire to Rainbow Farm.
September 2001: Crosslin is killed by FBI sharpshooters on September 3; Rohm is shot the next morning.

References

External links
 Book review of Burning Rainbow Farm
 www.rainbowfarmcamp.com

1950s births
2001 deaths
American cannabis activists
LGBT people from Michigan
People from Cass County, Michigan
People shot dead by law enforcement officers in the United States
Deaths by firearm in Michigan
20th-century American LGBT people